Chaudhary Fateh Singh, also known as Fateh Singh, is an Indian politician from the Aam Aadmi Party (AAP) in Delhi. He was member of the Sixth Legislative Assembly of Delhi and represented Gokalpur (Assembly constituency) of Delhi. Earlier, he was a member of the Bharatiya Janata Party (BJP). He was a member of First Legislative Assembly of Delhi and served as its deputy speaker from 1995 to 1998.

Personal life
He is a materials dealer. He is the son of Saktoo Singh. He is a Bachelor of Arts (BA) from Chaudhary Charan Singh University (CCS university) of Uttar Pradesh. He is married; his wife is a housewife.

Political career
Fateh Singh contested the 1993 Delhi Legislative Assembly elections in the Nand Nagari assembly constituency, which was reserved for scheduled castes, on a Bharatiya Janata Party (BJP) ticket. He got 13,429 votes and defeated his nearest rival Rup Chand of the Indian National Congress (INC) by a margin of 781 votes. He became member of the First Legislative Assembly of Delhi and was elected the deputy speaker from 1995 to 1998. He also was on the Rules Committee, as the deputy speaker.

Fateh Singh contested as an independent in 2008 Delhi Legislative Assembly elections from Gokalpur (Assembly constituency). He got 10,262 votes and came fourth. Bahujan Samaj Party's Surendra Kumar won, while BJP's Ranjeet Singh was third.

Fateh Singh defected to the Aam Aadmi Party (AAP) from the BJP in December 2014, with three other BJP leaders. This was officially announced in an AAP rally at Shahdara. He contested the 2015 Delhi Legislative Assembly elections from Gokalpur and got 71,240 votes, defeating the sitting MLA (member of Legislative Assembly) Ranjeet Singh of the BJP by the margin of 31,968 votes.

References

Delhi MLAs 2015–2020
Deputy Speakers of the Delhi Legislative Assembly
Living people
Place of birth missing (living people)
Aam Aadmi Party politicians from Delhi
Bharatiya Janata Party politicians from Delhi
1957 births